Churchill Retirement Living Limited is a British property and domestic construction company. It specialises in accommodation for old people, and has more than 200 retirement properties.

The company is privately owned and family run, and operates from six regional offices. In 2020 it was named as the 3rd Best Company to work for in the UK in the Sunday Times top 100 list.

For the 12 months to 30 June 2022, the company reported revenue of £200.1m and pre-tax profit of £34.6m.

In 2022 the company received the maximum 5 star rating for customer satisfaction from an independent survey by the Home Builders Federation (HBF).

History 

Spencer and Clinton McCarthy established Emlor Homes Limited in 2002; for about three months in 2003 it was known as Churchill Retirement Living Limited. In 2007 a company named Avenue Shelfco 35 Limited was renamed to Churchill Retirement Living, and then to Churchill Retirement Living Limited.

In 2010 John Sidney McCarthy was appointed director of another company, Churchill Retirement plc (company number 07428858).

In 2016 the company received the WhatHouse? "Housebuilder of the Year" award.

Carline Support Ltd. 
In 2020, the company launched a new Careline Support business to provide direct 24/7 emergency call service to over 6,000 apartment owners at its retirement developments across the country.

Awards 

Churchill Retirement Living has been accredited with a number of awards:

The Churchill Foundation 

In 2016, the company founded its own charitable trust, The Churchill Foundation (Charity No. 1164320). It has partnered with various charities including Macmillan Cancer Support, The Silver Line, Hope For Food and Walking With The Wounded.

In 2018 the Churchill Foundation announced that it had raised over £1 million in its first three years.

References

External links 

Property companies of the United Kingdom
Companies based in Hampshire
Housing for the elderly in the United Kingdom